Nabil Guelsifi (born 27 November 1986) is a French former professional footballer who played as a forward.

Career
Guelsifi was born in Lille, France. He joined Belgian club K.S.K. Ronse in 2007, achieving promotion to the Belgian Second Division in his first season there. He remained at Ronse until summer 2010 when he signed for K.S.V. Oudenaarde. In 2011 he joined Al-Muharraq SC in Bahrain for six months before signing for JS Massira in Morocco. He moved to Jeunesse Esch in Luxembourg in 2013.

Honours
Jeunesse Esch
 Luxembourg Cup: 2012–13

References

External links

Further reading
 

1986 births
Living people
French footballers
French sportspeople of Algerian descent
Association football forwards
Challenger Pro League players
Luxembourg National Division players
K.S.K. Ronse players
JS Massira players
Jeunesse Esch players
French expatriate footballers
Algerian expatriate sportspeople in Belgium
Expatriate footballers in Belgium
Algerian expatriate sportspeople in Morocco
Expatriate footballers in Morocco
Algerian expatriate sportspeople in Luxembourg
Expatriate footballers in Luxembourg